The following buildings were added to the National Register of Historic Places as part of the Downtown Miami Multiple Resources Area, a type of MPS Multiple Property Submission' (or MPS'').

Additional buildings were also covered in the study of Downtown Miami historic resources, but were not NRHP-listed due to owner objections at the time.  These include the Art Deco, 1930-built Shrine Building (Miami, Florida) and the Sears, Roebuck and Company Department Store (Miami, Florida). The latter was the first-built Art Deco building in the county, built in 1929, and it was later NRHP-listed.

See also
Downtown Miami
Downtown Miami Historic District
National Register of Historic Places listings in Miami, Florida

References

Downtown Miami
National Register of Historic Places Multiple Property Submissions in Florida
Buildings and structures in Miami
1989 establishments in Florida